Bad Gastein (formerly Badgastein; Southern Bavarian: Bod Goschdei) is a spa town in the district of St. Johann im Pongau, in the Austrian state of Salzburg. Picturesquely situated in a high valley of the Hohe Tauern mountain range, it is known for the Gastein Waterfall and a variety of Belle Époque hotel buildings.

Geography

It stretches along the upper Gastein Valley following the course of the Gastein Ache creek, a right tributary of the Salzach river. The valley separates the Hohe Tauern Ankogel Group in the east from the Goldberg Group in the west.

It is characterised by numerous historic multi-storey hotel buildings erected on the steep slopes.

The Gastein municipality comprises the cadastral communities of Badgastein, Böckstein, and Remsach. Its southern parts belong to the Hohe Tauern national park.

Transportation 
The Gastein valley is accessible by the Tauern Railway, a major railroad running from Schwarzach-Sankt Veit in the north across the Alpine crest through the Tauern Tunnel to Spittal an der Drau, Carinthia in the south. Frequent EuroCity and InterCity trains going along this route connect Bad Gastein with many Austrian cities like Vienna, Linz, Salzburg and Graz along a single circuit.

The B167 Gasteiner Straße highway also passes right through the Gastein valley. Through traffic from the northern branch-off at Lend in the Salzach valley passes the lower municipalities of Dorfgastein and Bad Hofgastein before reaching the Bad Gastein centre. However, in Böckstein at the head of the valley, the continuation southwards to Mallnitz in Carinthia requires cars to roll onto a shuttle train (Autoverladung) for a short trip through the Tauern Tunnel.

Spa and therapy 

The name "Bad" means "spa", reflecting the town's history as a health resort. The local Heilstollen (literally 'healing tunnel') thermal spring water earned the town its early fame. Theophrastus Parcelsus (1493–1541) had studied the spring water to discover its secrets. Marie Curie (1867–1934) and Heinrich Mache (1876–1954) helped to discover that it contained radon and as a result radon therapy began in the town.

Radon inhalation therapy at the Gasteiner Heilstollen began as a result of further investigation into the anecdotal experiences of silver miners who noticed improvements in symptoms from various ailments including arthritis.  Ankylosing spondylitis (also known as Bekhterev's disease), in particular, has been claimed to see positive results from treatment at the Heilstollen.  However, there is no empirical evidence of any benefit to inhaling radon. For example, one of the few studies to test the efficacy of spa treatments for ankylosing spondylitis found no statistically significant difference between a group that spent three weeks at Bad Gastein and a group that spent three weeks at a different spa without radon inhalation therapy. Claims of therapeutic benefits of radiation, beyond its application in radiotherapy, are considered quackery by medical professionals.

History 
The remote valley was settled by Bavarian peasants in the 9th century; field names in the highest-lying southern parts also denote a Carantanian (Slavic) colonization. Gastein is first mentioned as Gastuna in a 963 deed, when the area belonged to the German stem duchy of Bavaria. It was originally an alpine farming and gold mining area and the site of an ancient trade route crossing the main ridge of the Central Eastern Alps. In 1297 Duke Otto III and his brother Stephen I, both highly indebted, sold it to the Prince-Archbishops of Salzburg. Already about 1230, the minnesinger Neidhart von Reuental had referred to the hot springs in his Middle High German poem Die Graserin in der Gastein; the spas were visited by the Habsburg emperor Frederick III as well as by the Renaissance physician Paracelsus.

In the 19th century the waters of Bad Gastein became a fashionable resort, visited by European monarchs as well as the rich and famous. Some notable guests of the past included Empress Elisabeth of Austria (Sisi) and the German Emperor Wilhelm I with his chancellor Otto von Bismarck as well as Subhas Chandra Bose, a leading Indian nationalist,  Tsar Ferdinand I of Bulgaria, King Faisal I of Iraq, King Ibn Saud of Saudi Arabia and Iran's last king Mohammad Reza Pahlavi, industrialists like Wilhelm von Opel and artists like Heinrich Mann, Robert Stolz and W. Somerset Maugham. On 14 August 1865 Bismarck had signed the Gastein Convention with Austria concerning the joint administration of the provinces of Schleswig and Holstein after the Second Schleswig War.

The composer Franz Schubert composed his Piano Sonata in D Major in Bad Gastein, and was once believed to have sketched a Gmunden-Gastein Symphony (D. 849) during his stay in August and September 1825. Though no score appears to have survived for the latter, it is often identified with the Symphony No. 9 in C major (D. 944).

Mass tourism was pushed by the opening of the Tauern Railway station in 1905. From the 1960s on the resort lost some of its former reputation and many former hotels sit empty. Recently, Bad Gastein renovated its Felsentherme in 2014.

Places of interest 

 
 Catholic parish church
 Gletschermühlen
 Felsentherme
 Gasteiner Heilstollen
 Gasteiner Heimatmuseum im Haus Austria

Traditions 
Bad Gastein has vibrant pagan traditions that have been slightly assimilated into Roman Catholic tradition. One example of the pre-Christian Alpine traditions is the Krampus, now adopted as one of the Companions of Saint Nicholas.  The Krampus is an elemental, horned and demonic character, playfully re-enacted by bands of male revellers during December and also once every four years during a Perchten event or Perchtenlauf.  The Perchtenlauf happens every four years at Bad Gastein.  The most recent was in 2014.

Climate
Bad Gastein has a humid continental climate (Dfb) bordering on a subarctic climate (Dfc) due to the town's high elevation. Summers are mild, sometimes warm with cool, refreshing nights. Winters are moderately cold and snowy, with annual snowfall averaging 136 inches (345 cm).

Sports 

Beside its water treatments, the town is popular for winter sports. Bad Gastein hosted the 1958 World Championships in alpine skiing and regularly is a scene of the snowboarding and boardercross worldcup. The Bad Gastein and Bad Hofgastein ski resort is part of the larger Ski Amadé network, with Gastein valley having 4 ski areas with over 200 kilometers of downhill slopes. Many establishments on the slopes offer warmth, food and strong drinks.

Since 2007, the town also annually hosts the Gastein Ladies tennis tournament, an International event on the WTA Tour, attracting top players like Julia Görges.

Notable people 

 Thea Hochleitner (1925–2012), alpine skier 
 Hans Eder (1927–2008), Nordic skier
Franz Xaver Franzmair (1901–1988) hotelier and builder, Freeman of Bad Gastein
Hermann Greinwald  (1927–1990) doctor and mountain rescue doctor
Fritz Gruber (born 1940)  local historian of Gastein alley and botanist
Franz Schubert (1797–1828) composed after a holiday in Bad Gastein the "Gasteiner Piano Sonata in D major, D 850 (Schubert)"
Karl Straubinger (1855–1924) mayor (1882–1917), freeman of Bad Gasteins
Georg Thomalla (1915–1999) German actor
Karl Heinrich Waggerl (1897–1973) author, freeman of Bad Gastein
Erwin Wexberg  (1889–1957) individual psychologian, doctor, student of Alfred Adler
Eckart Witzigmann (born 1941) Austrian master cook, freeman of Bad Gastein
Maria Zittrauer (1913–1997) lyrician, Trakl-Prize-winner 1952
Fedor Ivanovich Shalyapin, singer, Feodor Chaliapin

Notes

References

External links 

 http://www.gastein.com – official homepage
 www.slopeseeker.com – An independent guide to skiing in Bad Gastein
 https://web.archive.org/web/20190822151847/https://www.gasteinertal.com/
 Many pictures of Bad Gastein
 http://www.gasteiner-heilstollen.com
 https://web.archive.org/web/20100421012723/http://gastein360.com/ – Gastein 360 panoramas, See Gastein and come to feel Gastein
 Bad Gastein photo gallery

Spa towns in Austria
Cities and towns in St. Johann im Pongau District
Ski areas and resorts in Austria
Ankogel Group
Goldberg Group
Belle Époque